Luca Vidi (born 7 July 1976 in St. Gallen, Switzerland) is a Swiss former Alpine Ski racer who competed in Slalom, Giant Slalom, Downhill and Super G. After retiring from the sport in 2001 due to injury, Vidi is now primarily an entrepreneur.

Career in sports
Starting with his first official competition under registry of the International Ski Federation in 1994 in Zermatt, Switzerland, Vidi competed until 2001, mainly in Switzerland, Austria and Italy - less frequently in France, Spain, Liechtenstein, Norway and South Korea. Notable performances include a 15th place in Super G at the European Cup in Altenmarkt-Zauchensee, Austria, in 1996 as well as first and second place in Downhill and Super G respectively at the Universiade in Muju, South Korea, in 1997.
Vidi's equipment of choice included bindings by Atomic and boots by Lange.

Career from 2001
Vidi retired from active sports in 2001 due to ever more frequent injuries and concentrated on studying business economics at University of St. Gallen. Still a student, he co-founded a subsidiary online-translation company in 2002 of which he remains CEO to this day.

Other notable activities
Vidi counts among the supporters of the NGO CCI (Centro de Convivência Infantil) who entertains a day school for children in Mogi-Mirim, Brazil.

References

External links
 24translate.ch
 International Ski Federation

Living people
1976 births
Swiss male alpine skiers
Universiade medalists in alpine skiing
Swiss businesspeople
Sportspeople from St. Gallen (city)
Universiade gold medalists for Switzerland
Competitors at the 1997 Winter Universiade